Lennox F.C. may refer to:

Lennox Football Club, a rugby union club from England in the late 19th/early 20th century
Lennox F.C. (Scotland), an association football club from Dumbarton, active in the 19th century
Lennox F.C., an association football club from London, which merged into Dulwich F.C. in 1884